The Palau Foundation is an art exhibition centre in the centre of Caldes d'Estrac, in the region of El Maresme (Catalonia). It was opened in May 2003, to exhibit and disseminate the art collection that had been compiled by Josep Palau i Fabre, as well as its archives and library. Of particular importance is its archive and bibliographical collection on Pablo Picasso. The Palau Foundation is part of the Catalan Art Museums Network and 'Espais Escrits', the Catalan Literary Heritage Network.

Permanent exhibition
The new exhibition of the permanent collection, divided into three rooms and opened on 24 October 2010, documents the relationships between Palau i Fabre and Picasso. It also provides information on the figure of Josep Palau i Oller, father of Palau i Fabre, painter, textile designer, toy designer and art collector.

References

External links
 Official site
 Festival Poesia i +
 Palau Foundation's Flickr
 Palau Foundation Vimeo channel
 Xarxa Espais Escrits
 Local Museum Network site

Barcelona Provincial Council Local Museum Network
Maresme
Pablo Picasso
Art museums and galleries in Catalonia
Biographical museums in Spain